Killer Instinkt is an album by the Austrian heavy metal band Stahlhammer. It was released in 1995. The album became popular throughout Germany and Austria, mainly due to the success of their video for the Pink Floyd cover "Another Brick in the Wall".

Track listing 
 "Another Brick in the Wall" – 3:58 (Pink Floyd cover)
 "Nur ein Tier" (Just an animal) – 3:59
 "Bis dass das Blut gefriert" (Until the blood freezes) – 4:45
 "Ravehead (Fuckhead-Rave)" – 1:55
 "Fuckhead" – 3:46
 "Ein Freund ging nach Amerika" (A friend went to America) – 3:05
 "Killer Instinkt" (Killer instinct) – 4:53
 "Psycho" – 4:07
 "Wakantanka" – 4:57
 "Verletzt" (Injured) – 5:03
 "Rache" (Revenge)
 "As Tears Go By" (hidden song) – 6:37

Personnel 
Gary Wheeler – vocals
Thomas Schuler – guitars
Peter Karolyi – bass
Michael Stocker – drums

Trivia 
The second song on the album, "Nur ein Tier", is also the last three words sung by Rammstein in their song "Tier".

External links 
 Stahlhammer: Killer Instinkt

1995 albums
Stahlhammer albums